El Rio is a gay bar located at 3158 Mission Street , San Francisco, California. It was the first gay bar to debut queer salsa in San Francisco. El Río was established in 1978 as a Leather Brazilian Gay Bar and has been recognized as a Legacy Business by the San Francisco Small Business Commission. El Rio is best known for supporting the community by providing a space for community gatherings, LGBT performances, diverse forms of music and dancing, and offering a space for community fundraising events.

History 
El Rio was founded by Malcolm Thornley and Robert Nett. The bar was inspired by their “leather motorcycle riding lifestyle and their love for Brazil.” Malcolm and Robert owned the bar from 1978 to 1997, until they retired. Dawn Huston took over the bar in 1997. However, Malcolm and Robert stayed in contact with the bar many years after their retirement.

Fundraisers 
El Rio describes itself as a neighborhood bar, and its location in the Mission District has contributed to its commitment to Latino communities. El Rio is “the longest-running multigender, multicultural, multigenerational live Latino music dance party in the city that attracts queers, straights, and others.”  El Rio is organized as a profit sharing business and community benefits are a fundamental element of their business model. El Rio focuses on accommodating everyone to help facilitate the process of organizing a fundraiser for people that have never done so before. Malcolm and Robert had weekly benefit parties that were extended once Dawn Huston became owner. The bar prioritizes local organizations in the Mission, LGBTQ rights organizations, local schools, children and family support organizations, women’s groups, gender justice organizations, and animal rescue agencies.

Fundraiser beneficiaries
 The Housing Rights Committee
 Causa Justa::Just Cause
 Mujeres Unidas y Activas
 Modern Times Bookstore
 The San Francisco Dyke March
 The Transgender, Gender Variant and Intersex Justice Project
 Breast Cancer Action
 The Chinese Progressive Association
 St James Infirmary Clinic
 The Mario Woods Foundation

Culture 
El Rio has hosted some of the longest running cultural events “that provide an anchor for LGBTQ communities of color in San Francisco.” Some of the events include:

 Salsa Sundays, a  live music party that has been rooted in the LGBT Latino community and has been running for over 30 years
 Mango, a monthly tea party for women of color and their friends

El Rio has also hosted after parties for both the Trans March and Dyke March. It has also been a gathering point for Dykes on Bikes.

El Rio is frequently described as a very inclusive space. They “have always been a mixed space, and our community also encompasses a broad range of public school teachers, service workers, construction workers and trades people, musicians, dancers, artists, politicians and activists.”

Recognition 
El Rio was awarded the Legacy Business Status. As stated by the San Francisco Bay Times, an LGBTQ News and Calendar for the Bay Area, legacy business recognize “the cultural importance of long standing, community-serving businesses.” The San Francisco Historic Preservation Commission noted that “El Rio’s back patio, garden, and massive lemon trees” should be “safeguarded.” Similarly, they also mentioned that their large font interior bar, wooden painting of Carmen Miranda and Marilyn Monroe, should be preserved as well.

It is very difficult to qualify for the Legacy Business Status. In terms of a legacy business, El Rio is 30 years or older, it contributed to the history and culture of its neighborhood, and it was nominated by Supervisor Hillary Ronen, District 9 in 2017. In Hillary Ronen’s letter of nomination, she distinctly accords that “El Rio is an anchor for the Mission District.”

Significant people associated with El Rio

 Phyllis Lyon and Del Martin, San Francisco’s feminists and civil rights activist were patrons of El Rio
 Jello Biafra, the former lead singer and songwriter of the San Francisco punk band The Dead Kennedys “regularly” attends shows at the bar.
 San Francisco Supervisors, Tom Ammiano and David Campos have held events at the bar
 Monika Treut, the famous German lesbian filmmaker filmed “Virgin Machine” (1988) at El Rio.

Accolades
 2016 “Best Neighborhood Bar” - Bay Area Reporter
 2016 “Best Small Live Music Venue” - Bay Area Reporter
 2016 “Best Women’s Party, Mango” - Bay Area Reporter
 2016 “Best Nightlife Party, Hard French” - Bay Area Reporter
 2015/16 “Best Dog Friendly Bar” - Bay Woof Readers
 2015 “Best Neighborhood Bar, Mango,” “Best Women’s Party, Hard French,” “Best Afternoon Party” - Bay Area Reporter
 2014 “Best Dog Friendly Bar” - Bay Woof Readers
 2014 “Best Lesbian Bar” - Bay Guardian Readers
 2013 “Best Dive Bar” - Bay Guardian
 2013 “Best Dive Bar” - foursquare
2013 “Best Queer Dance Spot ~ Hard French” - Bay Guardian
 2013 “Best Food Cart ~ Rocky’s Fry Bread” - Bay Guardian
 2012 “Small Business Award: Community Service”
 2012 “Community Ally Award” - Harvy Milk Club
 2012 “Pride Community Award” - SF Pride
 2012 “Certificate of Special Congressional Recognition” - SF Mayor/Board Of Supervisors
 2012 “Certificate of Honor” - Board of Supervisors

See also 
gay bar
Trans March
Dyke March
Bay Area Reporter
San Francisco Bay Times
Homosocialization
lesbian bar

References 

1978 establishments in California
LGBT nightclubs in California
LGBT culture in San Francisco
LGBT drinking establishments in California
Types of drinking establishment